The flammulated bamboo tyrant (Hemitriccus flammulatus), also called flammulated pygmy tyrant is a species of bird in the family Tyrannidae, the tyrant flycatchers. It is found in Amazonian Peru and Bolivia, and the bordering states of Brazil's northwest, the North Region.
Its natural habitat is subtropical or tropical moist lowland forests.

This tyrant is a small brown bird, with darker brown wings and a short tail; it has a whitish breast, black legs and eyes, and a short, sharp-pointed bill, for hawking insects in flight.

Distribution

Range: Amazonian Peru and Bolivia
The flammulated bamboo tyrant is found in the headwater areas of the Amazon Basin in southeastern Peru and northern Bolivia; also neighboring Brazilian states in the border regions, of Acre, Rondônia, and Mato Grosso.

It is found in the upstream half of the Ucayali River in Peru; in Bolivia it ranges from the Guaporé River with Brazil, and to the northwest all the tributaries to the northeast flowing Amazon Basin Madeira River.

References

External links
Flammulated bamboo tyrant photo gallery VIREO Photo-High Res

Hemitriccus
Birds of Peru
Birds of Bolivia
Birds of Brazil
Birds of the Amazon Basin
Birds described in 1901
Taxonomy articles created by Polbot